Chayene Medeiros Oliveira Santos (born 29 September 1990), commonly known as Chay, is a Brazilian footballer who plays as a forward for Ceará, on loan from Botafogo.

Early life
Named after the character from the Sergio Leone spaghetti western Once Upon a Time in the West, Chay was born in Maceió, Alagoas, and moved to Niterói, Rio de Janeiro at the age of 4. Upon arriving at the new city, he started a treatment for a number of allergies, and started in futsal after a recommendation from a doctor.

Club career
Chay began his senior career with Canto do Rio in 2008, playing in the Campeonato Carioca Série C, before joining Bonsucesso, where he featured mainly for the under-20 side. He then moved abroad to Thailand in 2009, where he notably scored 17 goals in the 2011 Thai Division 1 League for Songkhla.

In 2013, Chay switched to Malaysia and signed for Kedah FA; back to Brazil during a holiday period, he was hit by a stray bullet. Allegedly "unsettled" at the club, he returned to his home country and started to play seven-a-side football, featuring for the likes of Fluminense, Flamengo and Botafogo. In 2018, he was called up to the Brazil seven-a-side national team, winning the Copa América de Seleções and being named the best seven-a-side player in South America.

Chay also returned to association football in 2017, with Bela Vista.

On 16 January 2019, Chay was announced as new signing of Rio Branco-AC. He returned to the Rio de Janeiro state on 23 April, after agreeing to a contract with America-RJ.

Chay moved to Portuguesa-RJ for the 2020 sesason, being a regular starter in the club's Campeonato Carioca and Série D campaigns. He was a spotlight in the 2021 Carioca after scoring five times in only thirteen matches.

On 25 May 2021, Chay was announced at Série B side Botafogo, on loan until the end of the year. On 31 August, after scoring eight goals, he signed a permanent deal with the club until 2024; Portuguesa retained 50% of his economic rights.

Career statistics

Honours
Botafogo
 Campeonato Brasileiro Série B: 2021

References

External links
 Chayene Santos at Goal.com

1990 births
Living people
People from Maceió
Brazilian footballers
Association football forwards
Campeonato Brasileiro Série A players
Campeonato Brasileiro Série B players
Campeonato Brasileiro Série D players
Canto do Rio Football Club players
Mogi Mirim Esporte Clube players
Rio Branco Football Club players
America Football Club (RJ) players
Associação Atlética Portuguesa (RJ) players
Botafogo de Futebol e Regatas players
Cruzeiro Esporte Clube players
Songkhla F.C. players
Muangthong United F.C. players
Buriram F.C. players
Sisaket F.C. players
Kedah Darul Aman F.C. players
Brazilian expatriate footballers
Brazilian expatriate sportspeople in Thailand
Brazilian expatriate sportspeople in Malaysia
Expatriate footballers in Thailand
Expatriate footballers in Malaysia
Sportspeople from Alagoas